The Brewster-Douglass Housing Projects (officially named the Frederick Douglass Homes, and alternately named Frederick Douglass Projects, Frederick Douglass Apartments, Brewster-Douglass Homes, and Brewster-Douglass Projects) were the largest residential housing project owned by the city of Detroit, located in the Brush Park section on the east side of Detroit, Michigan, United States, near the Chrysler Freeway, Mack Avenue and St. Antoine Street. The housing project is named after Brewster Street, which ran through the area, and Frederick Douglass, African American abolitionist, author, and reformer.

The complex was home to such notable figures as Diana Ross, Mary Wilson, Florence Ballard, Lily Tomlin, Loni Love, and Etterlene DeBarge, during their early years. The claymation animated series The PJs was based on the housing project as well. It was also seen in screenshots for the movie Dreamgirls, as well as D12's debut music video. Brewster-Douglass is also mentioned in the first verse of singer/drag queen RuPaul's musical hit Supermodel (You Better Work).

History

Hastings Street 
Hastings Street was the center of black culture in Detroit between the 1920s and 1950s.. Located at the southern edge of the future Brewster-Douglass Homes, the street was the home of innumerable salons and entertainment venues. With the addition of the high-rises and an influx of people moving into the housing, Hastings Street was billed as the place you could fulfill any conceivable need. Hastings Street was most famously referenced in the John Lee Hooker song "Boogie Chillen'".

Brewster-Douglass Homes

The Brewster Project and Frederick Douglass Apartments were built between 1935 and 1955, and were designed by Harley, Ellington & Day of Detroit. The Brewster Project began construction in 1935, when First Lady Eleanor Roosevelt broke ground for the 701-unit development; the first phase, consisting of low-rise apartment blocks, was completed in 1938. An expansion of the project completed in 1941 brought the total number of housing units to 941. The Frederick Douglass Apartments, built immediately to the south of the Brewster Project, began construction in 1942 with the completion of apartment rows, two 6-story low-rises, and finally six 14-story high rises completed between 1952 and 1955. The combined Brewster-Douglass Project was five city blocks long, and three city blocks wide, and housed anywhere between 8,000 and 10,000 residents, at its peak capacity.

The Brewster-Douglass Project were built for the "working poor"; the Detroit Housing Commission required an employed parent for each family before establishing tenancy. As the Commission became less selective, crime became a problem in the 1960s and 1970s, and the projects eventually fell into disrepair. The Frederick Douglass Apartment towers were converted to senior housing.

In 1991, the low-rise apartment blocks north of Wilkins Street (the original Brewster Project) were demolished, and by 1994 were replaced with 250 townhomes. This new public housing, administratively distinct from the Fredrick Douglass Homes project, was dubbed the "Brewster Homes", and still exists today.

In the meantime, the remaining housing on the project site continued to deteriorate. Two of the six 14-story Frederick Douglass Apartments towers, 303 and 304, were demolished in 2003, in an effort to consolidate living space and reduce maintenance costs. By 2008, only 280 families remained in the Frederick Douglass Homes complex, and the decision was made to shut down the housing entirely. The buildings south of Wilkins street were left abandoned after that date.

On July 29, 2013, 23-year-old French artist Bilal Berreni was found dead from a gunshot wound on the property of Brewster-Douglass, having last been seen the day before. Found without identification, Berreni's body was not identified for 7 months. Jasin Curtis and Drequone Rich each pled guilty to second degree murder and received 25-30 year prison sentences in 2015; Dionte Travis received a 60-year prison sentence in January 2016.

Demolition of the remaining buildings of the Frederick Douglass Homes began on September 4, 2013. Demolition was substantially complete by the end of August, 2014.

From historic marker on the site of Brewster Homes

Between 1910 and 1940 Detroit, Michigan's African American population increased dramatically. In 1935, First Lady Eleanor Roosevelt broke ground for the Brewster Homes, the nation’s first federally funded public housing development for African Americans. The homes opened in 1938 with 701 units. When completed in 1941 there were 941 units bounded by Beaubien, Hastings, Mack and Wilkins Streets. Residents were required to be employed and there were limits on what they could earn. Former residents described Brewster as 'community filled with families that displayed love, respect and concern for everyone in a beautiful, clean and secure neighborhood.' The original Brewster Homes were demolished in 1991 and replaced by 250 townhouses.

Future 
On March 9, 2012, Mayor of Detroit Dave Bing announced that the Detroit Housing Commission planned to request funding from the Department of Housing and Urban Development to demolish all remaining housing on the Frederick Douglass Homes site, but redevelop the abandoned Brewster-Wheeler Recreation Center. The vacant land would then be developed as affordable housing and commercial space. The demolition was announced on November 15, 2012.

Constituent buildings 
The six concrete-framed towers were designed in the Modern movement architectural style and faced in brick. They are virtually identical in look and each rise to the height of 15 floors.

Schools
The buildings were zoned to the following Detroit Public Schools facilities:
 Spain Elementary School (K–8)
 Martin Luther King High School (9–12)

See also
Public housing in Detroit

References

External links 
 Fredrick Douglass Projects at Detroiturbex.com
 Google Maps location of Frederick Douglass Homes
 SkyscraperPage.com's pages on Frederick Douglass Homes
 Frederick Douglass Homes at Emporis.com

African-American history in Detroit
Public housing in Detroit
Residential buildings completed in 1955
Demolished buildings and structures in Detroit
1955 establishments in Michigan
2014 disestablishments in Michigan
Buildings and structures demolished in 2014